John Seys (March 30, 1799 – 1872) was an American reverend, missionary, and diplomat.

Biography 
Seys was born in St. Croix, in the West Indies, to a wealthy white family on March 30, 1799.

Seys chose to work as a Methodist reverend, and his family disinherited him for it. He started his career by working with the Mohawk peoples for several decades but left for work in Africa in the 1830s. Following the death of his predecessor, Beveridge Cox, Seys led the Methodist mission in Liberia for ten years until poor health forced him to resign in 1844. During his time in leadership he became actively involved in establishing new schools in the country.

Seys served as Minister Resident to Liberia from the United States from January 2, 1867, to June 11, 1870. In this position, Seys faced many obstacles due to the lack of funds coming from the United States. Despite this, he actively pushed against what he saw as the evils of slavery. Although he was opposed to the practice of slavery, he would write in defense of Captain Nathaniel Gordon at Gordon's trial for slave trafficking and piracy.

Seys died in 1872 after having fathered 12 children with five different women, however many died before him due to 'African fever.'

References 

1799 births
1872 deaths
Ambassadors of the United States to Liberia
American Methodist missionaries
Methodist abolitionists
Methodist missionaries in Liberia
People from Saint Croix, U.S. Virgin Islands
19th-century American diplomats